The Canon EOS M5 is a digital mirrorless interchangeable-lens camera announced by Canon on September 15, 2016, and released in November 2016. 

As with all of the Canon EOS M series cameras, the M5 uses the Canon EF-M lens mount. With the EF-EOS M adapter, any other Canon EF lens mount or Canon EF-S lens mount lens can be used.

The M5 is the first M series camera with an integrated electronic viewfinder. The screen is tiltable and can be articulated downwards, so that a vlogger can see themselves in the screen.

Key features
Canon EF-M lens mount
24.2 megapixel dual-pixel, APS-C, CMOS sensor. The same sensor is used in the Canon EOS 80D.
ISO 100 – 25600
Dual Pixel CMOS autofocus
1.62M-dot articulating touchscreen
2.36-million dot OLED built-in electronic viewfinder (EVF). The EOS M5 is the first Canon mirrorless with a built-in electronic viewfinder.
DIGIC 7 processor

See also
Canon EOS M
Canon EOS M2
Canon EOS M3
Canon EOS M6
Canon EOS M10
Canon EOS M50
Canon EOS M100

References

External links 
Canon EOS M site

Canon EF-M-mount cameras